Adele Mary Blood (April 23, 1886 – September 13, 1936) was an American actress in silent movies, vaudeville, and theater.

Biography
 
Blood was born on April 23, 1886, in Alameda, California, to Ira E. Blood and Frances Emma Stewart. Her mother was a member of the Alameda school department for many years. Adele moved to the eastern United States some years before 1917. As a youth, she was a talented equestrienne, had an interest in fashion, and admired the theater.

Career
Blood's first public performance was at the California Theatre in San Francisco. She acted the character Marguerite in a production featuring Lewis Morrison as Mephisto. Blood appeared in numerous plays as the leading lady. Some of the theatrical presentations in which she starred are The Unmasking, All Rivers Meet The Sea, and The Picture of Dorian Gray. In the latter she was with the stock company of Edward Davis, her first husband. Davis was a clergyman-actor who was formerly the pastor of the First Christian Church in Oakland, California. Their marriage was turbulent and Blood began divorce proceedings in 1914. Actress Jule Power was named as co-respondent in her suit. Davis responded by naming Governor Earl Brewer of Mississippi as co-respondent in counter charges against Blood. She finally won her divorce suit after which she left on a tour of the Orient. Following her divorce from Davis she was briefly married to Englishman Waddell Hope.  

During her vaudeville tours Blood was on stage in most of the prominent cities in the United States. She starred for five years in Everywoman. During her travels she was known as "the most beautiful blonde on the American stage". She made two motion pictures including The Devil's Toy (1916) and The Riddle: Woman (1920).

By December 1917, Blood retired. She became the devoted companion of her sister-in-law, Susanna Holmes, who was known as the "Silver Queen". Blood became named heiress to the Holmes' fortune. Blood eventually eschewed both wealth and social position because she believed it led to a philosophy of pessimism. She returned to the stage by accepting an offer from the Oriental company of Tim Frawley.

In 1926 she met Colonel R.W. Castle in Kashmir. He was an English officer in the Indian service. The two were engaged and planned a wedding in Calcutta.

Death
On the night of September 13, 1936, Blood shot herself in the head at her home on the grounds of the Westchester Country Club in Harrison, New York. She died a few hours later at the United Hospital in Port Chester, New York.

Her 17-year-old daughter, Dawn, was in the home with friends when they heard the sound of a gunshot come from Blood's bedroom. Dawn told police that her mother had been financially pressed and worried excessively in the previous two weeks. That summer, Blood had financed a summer stock company and leased the auditorium of the Bronxville High School for plays. The plays were scheduled to run for six weeks, but closed in three weeks. Both mother and daughter appeared in the casts.

Adele's possessions were auctioned off garnering $1,000.

Dawn Blood died by suicide in July 1939. She was 19.

References

External links

 
 

Actresses from San Francisco
American film actresses
American stage actresses
American silent film actresses
Suicides by firearm in New York (state)
Vaudeville performers
1886 births
1936 deaths
20th-century American actresses
1936 suicides